Kevin Izod O'Doherty (7 September 1823 – 15 July 1905) was an Irish Australian politician who, as a Young Irelander, had been transported to Tasmania in 1849. He was first elected to the Queensland Legislative Assembly in 1867. In the 1885 he returned to Europe briefly serving as an Irish Home Rule MP at Westminster before returning in 1886 as a private citizen to Brisbane.

Biography
O'Doherty was born in Dublin on 7 September 1823, although other sources including the Dictionary of Australasian Biography indicate he was born in June 1824. Charles Gavan Duffy, in his My Life in Two Hemispheres, states that O'Doherty was still under age when he was arrested in July 1848; however, Gavan Duffy was writing 50 years later. O'Doherty received a good education and studied medicine, but before he was qualified, joined the Young Ireland party and in June 1848, together with Thomas Antisell and Richard D'Alton Williams, established The Irish Tribune. Only five editions were issued, the first being on 10 June 1848. On 10 July 1848, when the fifth edition was issued, O'Doherty was arrested and charged with treason-felony. At the first and second trials the juries disagreed, but at the third trial he was found guilty and sentenced to transportation for 10 years.

O'Doherty arrived in Tasmania in November 1849, was at once released on parole to reside at Oatlands, and his professional services were utilised at St. Mary's Hospital, Hobart. The other Irish prisoners nicknamed him 'St Kevin'.(see, Christine Kinealy, 'Repeal and Revolution. 1848 in Ireland', Manchester, 2009). In 1854 received a pardon with the condition that he must not reside in Great Britain or Ireland. He went to Paris and carried on his medical studies, making one secret visit to Ireland to marry Mary Eva Kelly, to whom he was affianced before leaving Ireland. He received an unconditional pardon in 1856, and completed his studies in Dublin, graduating FRCS in 1857. He practised in Dublin successfully, and in 1862 went to Brisbane, Australia and became well known as one of its leading physicians.

O'Doherty was elected a member of the Queensland Legislative Assembly in 1867, in 1872 was responsible for a health act being passed, and w as also one of the early opponents of the traffic in kanakas. In 1877 he transferred to the Queensland Legislative Council, and in 1885 resigned as he intended to settle in Europe.

In Ireland O'Doherty was cordially welcomed, and was returned unopposed as Irish Parliamentary Party MP for North Meath to the House of Commons of the United Kingdom in the November 1885 general election; but finding the climate did not suit him he did not seek re-election in 1886, and returned to Brisbane in that year. He attempted to take up his medical practice again but was not successful, and he died in poor circumstances on 15 July 1905.

His wife and a daughter survived him. A fund was raised by public subscription to provide for his widow, Mary Eva (1826–1910), a poet, who in her early days was well known as the author of Irish patriotic verse in The Nation under the soubriqet "Eva". In Australia she occasionally contributed to Queensland journals, and one of her poems is included in A Book of Queensland Verse. She died at Brisbane on 21 May 1910.

See also
List of convicts transported to Australia

Further reading

References

External links

Kevin Izod O'Doherty, convict Queenslander

1823 births
1905 deaths
19th-century Australian medical doctors
Convicts transported to Australia
Fellows of the Royal College of Surgeons
Irish Parliamentary Party MPs
Members of the Parliament of the United Kingdom for County Meath constituencies (1801–1922)
People from Brisbane
Politicians from County Dublin
UK MPs 1885–1886
Young Irelanders
Members of the Queensland Legislative Assembly
Members of the Queensland Legislative Council
Recipients of British royal pardons
Burials at Toowong Cemetery